Óscar Martínez (born 1 June 1976 in Madrid) is a Spanish TV presenter. Since September 2012 he also hosts the Night Show of radio station  and he was the host of Miss Spain.

References

1976 births
Living people
People from Madrid
Beauty pageant hosts
21st-century Spanish people